Michael Anthony Hampton (born January 17, 1972) is an American college baseball coach and former third baseman. He is the interim head baseball coach at the St. John's University. Hampton played college baseball at Clemson University from 1993 to 1994 before pursuing a professional career from 1994 to 1997. In college, he was named an All-American in 1994.

Playing career
As a junior at Clemson University in 1993, Hampton had a .254 batting average, a .322 on-base percentage (OBP), and a .454 SLG, with nine home runs.

As a senior in 1994, Hampton batted .380 with a .596 SLG, 11 home runs, and 70 RBIs. He was named first team All-Atlantic Coast Conference and he was also named a first-team All-American by Collegiate Baseball.

Hampton was selected in the 4th round of the 1994 Major League Baseball draft by the Cincinnati Reds. After three years in the team's farm system, Hampton retired due to injuries.

Coaching career
On September 1, 1998, Hampton was named an assistant coach at his alma mater, Clemson. Following a lone season at Clemson, Hampton was named the hitting coach at West Virginia University, where worked for two seasons.

In the fall of 2001, Hampton joined Ed Blankmeyer's coaching staff at St. John's University.

On January 9, 2020, Hampton was promoted to the interim head baseball coach at St. John's following Ed Blankmeyer's resignation to join the Brooklyn Cyclones.

Head coaching record

See also
 List of current NCAA Division I baseball coaches

References

External links

St. John's Red Storm bio

Living people
1972 births
Baseball third basemen
Clemson Tigers baseball players
Billings Mustangs players
Charleston AlleyCats players
Burlington Bees players
Clemson Tigers baseball coaches
West Virginia Mountaineers baseball coaches
St. John's Red Storm baseball coaches
West Virginia University alumni
Sportspeople from Colorado Springs, Colorado